Made for Lovin' You may refer to:
"Made for Lovin' You" (Dan Seals song), also recorded by Clinton Gregory and Doug Stone
"Made for Lovin' You" (Anastacia song)

See also
"I Was Made for Lovin' You"